Meconopsis bhutanica is a Himalayan blue poppy species endemic to Bhutan.

References

bhutanica
Flora of Bhutan
Endemic flora of Bhutan